James Michael McIlvaine (born July 30, 1972) is an American former professional basketball player who spent seven seasons in the National Basketball Association (NBA) with the Washington Bullets, Seattle SuperSonics, and New Jersey Nets. The 7-foot-1 shot-blocking specialist is perhaps best remembered for the fall-out that occurred after he signed with the Seattle SuperSonics in 1996.

McIlvaine is married to Gwendolyn, a 6'7" center of the University of North Carolina's 1994 championship women's basketball team. He is former radio color analyst for Marquette men's basketball and is part of the online support staffer for Optima Batteries in Milwaukee.

NBA career

Early career
After playing at St. Catherine's High School in Racine (averaging 22.9 points, 11.1 rebounds and 8.1 blocked shots as a senior) and blocking a school-record 399 shots at Marquette University, McIlvaine was named NABC Defensive Player of the Year and was drafted with the fifth pick in the second round of the 1994 draft by the Washington Bullets (now Washington Wizards). He spent two years with the team, primarily in a backup role to Gheorghe Mureșan. In limited playing time, McIlvaine averaged fewer than 15 minutes a game during his second year. In 1996, McIlvaine entered free agency.

Seattle SuperSonics signing
In 1996, the Sonics offered a seven-year, $33.6 million free-agent contract to McIlvaine. Seattle fans were upset, and so was superstar forward Kemp, who had been asking for a contract increase after leading the team to a franchise-record 64 wins and its best postseason performance in 17 years, including the third Finals appearance in franchise history. But because Kemp signed a contract extension in 1994, the NBA's collective bargaining agreement (CBA) forbid any changes to that contract until October 1997.

Despite fan derision, McIlvaine helped the Sonics win their division in each of his two years with the team. Following the 1997 season, Seattle was involved in a three-team trade that sent Kemp to the Cleveland Cavaliers in exchange for the Milwaukee Bucks' Vin Baker, with the Cavaliers' Terrell Brandon and Tyrone Hill going to Milwaukee.

Final years
In his first season in Seattle, McIlvaine registered career highs in games (82), minutes (1,477), points per game (3.8), rebounds per game (4.0), and steals (0.5), while also averaging two blocks per game. His second season in Seattle saw him decline in every major statistical category, although he still posted numbers close to his career bests in most areas.  Eventually, McIlvaine was dealt to New Jersey in 1999 for Don MacLean and Michael Cage, primarily to open up salary cap room.

McIlvaine rounded out his career with the Nets, playing three injury-riddled seasons with the team.  In 1999–2000, McIlvaine played 66 games in his best season since leaving Seattle, but injury problems and  declining numbers continued to hamper him until his contract was bought out by the Nets after the 2000–01 NBA season.  McIlvaine retired with an average of 2.7 points, 3.1 rebounds, and 1.71 blocks in 401 career games.

NBA career statistics

Regular season

|-
| style="text-align:left;"| 
| style="text-align:left;"| Washington
| 55 || 0 || 9.7 || .479 || – || .683 || 1.9 || .2 || .2 || 1.1 || 1.7
|-
| style="text-align:left;"| 
| style="text-align:left;"| Washington
| 80 || 6 || 14.9 || .428 || – || .552 || 2.9 || .1 || .3 || 2.1 || 2.3
|-
| style="text-align:left;"| 
| style="text-align:left;"| Seattle
| 82 || 79 || 18.0 || .471 || .143 || .495 || 4.0 || .3 || .5 || 2.0 || 3.8
|-
| style="text-align:left;"| 
| style="text-align:left;"| Seattle
| 78 || 72 || 15.5 || .453 || .000 || .556 || 3.3 || .2 || .3 || 1.8 || 3.2
|-
| style="text-align:left;"| 
| style="text-align:left;"| New Jersey
| 22 || 1 || 12.2 || .431 || – || .667 || 2.5 || .1 || .4 || 1.5 || 2.2
|-
| style="text-align:left;"| 
| style="text-align:left;"| New Jersey
| 66 || 53 || 15.9 || .416 || – || .518 || 3.5 || .5 || .4 || 1.8 || 2.4
|-
| style="text-align:left;"| 
| style="text-align:left;"| New Jersey
| 18 || 3 || 10.7 || .357 || – || .667 || 1.9 || .2 || .4 || .8 || 1.6
|-
| style="text-align:center;" colspan="2"| Career
| 401 || 214 || 14.8 || .446 || .100 || .551 || 3.1 || .3 || .3 || 1.7 || 2.7

Playoffs

|-
| style="text-align:left;"| 1997
| style="text-align:left;"| Seattle
| 5 || 0 || 5.6 || .571 || – || .500 || .4 || .0 || .2 || .4 || 1.8
|-
| style="text-align:left;"| 1998
| style="text-align:left;"| Seattle
| 6 || 4 || 9.8 || .300 || .000 || .500 || 1.7 || .2 || .3 || 1.0 || 2.2
|-
| style="text-align:center;" colspan="2"| Career
| 11 || 4 || 7.9 || .370 || .000 || .500 || 1.1 || .1 || .3 || .7 || 2.0

See also
 List of NCAA Division I men's basketball career blocks leaders
 List of NCAA Division I men's basketball players with 13 or more blocks in a game

References

External links
College & NBA stats @ Basketball-Reference.com
Scan of article about cars written by Jim McIlvaine

1972 births
Living people
American men's basketball players
Basketball players from Wisconsin
Centers (basketball)
Marquette Golden Eagles men's basketball players
New Jersey Nets players
Seattle SuperSonics players
Sportspeople from the Milwaukee metropolitan area
Sportspeople from Racine, Wisconsin
Washington Bullets draft picks
Washington Bullets players